Simon John Bullock (born 	28 September 1962) is an English former professional footballer who played in the Football League for Halifax Town.

Career
Bullock was born in Stoke-on-Trent and began his career with Stoke City. He failed to break into the first team at Stoke and joined Fourth Division side Halifax Town in 1980 where he spent two seasons making 18 appearances.

Career statistics
Source:

References

English footballers
English Football League players
Stoke City F.C. players
Halifax Town A.F.C. players
1962 births
Living people
Association football forwards